Margaret Walker   is a British speech and language therapist

Career
Walker was one of the three developers of the language programme Makaton. The name of the programme is derived from the first letters of the names of the three therapists who helped devise the programme in the 1970s: Margaret Walker, Katharine Johnston and Tony Cornforth.

Walker was awarded Fellowship of the Royal College of Speech and Language Therapists in 1986, an MBE in the 1997 Birthday Honours for services to Healthcare whilst working at St George's, University of London, and in 2019 was recognised in the Pride of Britain Awards.

References

Living people
British women academics
Speech and language pathologists
Year of birth missing (living people)
Fellows of the Royal College of Speech and Language Therapists
Members of the Order of the British Empire